Constance Piers (Fairbanks; May 10, 1866 – 1939) was a Canadian journalist, poet, and editor.

Early life and education
Constance Fairbanks was born in Dartmouth, Nova Scotia, May 10, 1866. She belonged to an old provincial family nearly all of whose representatives possessed more or less literary ability, and several of whom were long associated with the history of Nova Scotia. She was the second child and oldest daughter of Lewis Piers Fairbanks and Ella Augusta (DeWolfe) Fairbanks, granddaughter of Charles Rufus Fairbanks, and was one of a family of nine children.

Owing to delicate health when a child, Piers was able to attend school in Dartmouth only in an irregular manner, but, being precocious and fond of the company of those older than herself, she gained much knowledge outside of the school-room. At the age of thirteen years, she ceased to have systematic instruction, and with patient determination she proceeded to carry on her education by means of careful reading.

Career
Constance's father’s business reversals obliged her to work for a living, which was highly exceptional among daughters of the upper middle class. Finding it necessary to obtain employment, she became, in 1887, secretary to Charles Frederick Fraser, the blind editor of the Halifax Critic, and in that position, gained a practical knowledge of the work which became her occupation. Gradually, as her ability to write became known, and as she developed a keen recognition of what was required by the public, Piers was placed in charge of various departments of the paper, until in June, 1890, the management of the editorial and certain other departments was virtually transferred to her. She took editorial charge of the Halifax Critic, as assistant editor, 1890–92; and associate editor of the St. Johnsbury, Vermont Caledonian, 1893-94. 

She was a writer of numerous articles in the Critic, the Caledonian, and others, and many poems, which appeared in the Week (Toronto), Canadian Magazine (Toronto), and other journals, and some of which were contained in Dr. Theodore Harding Rand's A Treasury of Canadian Verse. She contributed papers to the Halifax Ladies' Musical Club and various literary societies. She selected and edited, jointly with husband, the poems of Mary Jane Katzmann, published under the title of Frankincense and Myrrh: Selections From the Poems of the Late Mrs. William Lawson (Halifax), 1893.

Personal life

On January 7, 1901, in Halifax, she married Harry Piers (curator of the Provincial Museum of Nova Scotia, and librarian of the Provincial Science Library). They had one son: Edward Stanyan Fairbanks Piers.

Piers was interested in music, literature, and art. She favored woman suffrage, but not militant methods. She was a member of the Church of England, and the Ladies' Musical Club (a society organized for the study of music and of the lives of composers and their works). 

Piers died in 1939.

References

Attribution

External links
 
 
 

1866 births
1939 deaths
Canadian women journalists
Canadian newspaper editors
Canadian women non-fiction writers
Canadian women poets
Journalists from Nova Scotia
People from Dartmouth, Nova Scotia
Writers from Halifax, Nova Scotia
Women newspaper editors
19th-century Canadian journalists
19th-century Canadian women writers
20th-century Canadian journalists
20th-century Canadian women writers
19th-century Canadian poets
Wikipedia articles incorporating text from A Woman of the Century